José Agustín Goytisolo Gay (Barcelona, 13 April 1928 – 19 March 1999) was a Spanish poet, scholar and essayist. He was the brother of Juan Goytisolo and Luis Goytisolo, also writers.

Biography 

Born in Barcelona on 13 April 1928, in an upper class Spanish-only speaking family (that is, non Catalan-speaking though he spoke perfect Catalan and translated Catalan poems into other languages), his family was brutally shaken by the death of his mother (Julia Gay) in a Franoist Nationalist bombardment in 1938. José Agustín was especially affected and named his daughter after his lost mother. In Words for Julia, one of his best-known poems (sung by Paco Ibáñez and Los Suaves, among others), he joins the love for both women. In 1993, in the Elegies to Julia Gay, he united all his mother-themed poems. He also deals with his feelings toward his mother in his later books The return (1955) and End of a goodbye (1984).

He started studying Law in the University of Barcelona, and ended his studies in Madrid. He was a member of the so-called "Generation of the 50s", along with writers such as Ángel González, José Manuel Caballero, José Ángel Valente and Jaime Gil de Biedma. They shared a moral or politic commitment and a renewed attention to the lyrics and the language.

In the 1960s and 1970s he was a key contributor to the development of Ricardo Bofill Taller de Arquitectura as a multidisciplinary endeavor. From that experience he drew a collection of poems named Taller de Arquitectura, published in 1976.

According to Manuel Vázquez Montalbán, Goytisolo's poetry was not just an ideological substitute for the capitalism of Francoist Spain, but aspired to build a new humanism:

Works 

El retorno 1955
Salmos al viento 1956
Claridad 1959
Años decisivos 1961
Algo sucede 1968
Bajo tolerancia 1973
Taller de Arquitectura 1976
Del tiempo y del olvido 1977
Palabras para Julia 1979
Los pasos del cazador 1980
A veces gran amor 1981
Sobre las circunstancias 1983
Final de un adiós 1984
Como los trenes de la noche 1994
Cuadernos de El Escorial 1995
Elegías a Julia Gay 1993

Anthologies 

 Poetas catalanes contemporáneos 1968
 Poesía cubana de la Revolución 1970
 Antología de José Lezama Lima
 Antología de Jorge Luis Borges
 Los poemas son mi orgullo, poetic anthology. Edition by Carme Riera (Lumen publishing, 2003)

Translations 

He was involved in important translations from Italian and Catalan to Spanish. He translated, among others, works by Cesare Pavese, Pier Paolo Pasolini, Salvador Espriu and Pere Quart.

Prizes 

 Premio Adonais (1954)
 Premio Boscán (1956)
 Premio Ausias March (1959)

References

Sources
 José Agustín Goytisolo legacy

1928 births
1999 suicides
Writers from Barcelona
Spanish translators
Translators from Spanish
Italian–Spanish translators
Translators to Catalan
20th-century translators
20th-century Spanish poets
20th-century Spanish male writers
Spanish male poets
Suicides by jumping in Spain